Monthyon is a commune in the Seine-et-Marne department of the Île-de-France region in north-central France.

Notable residents
The Belgian painter Eugène Boch lived in the Villa La Grimpette. In 1959, French actor Jean-Claude Brialy acquired a château in the commune; he lived there, with his partner, until he died in 2007.

Demographics
From a population of 858 in 1975, Monthyon grew to 1,730 by 2018. The inhabitants of Monthyon are called Monthyonnais.

See also
Communes of the Seine-et-Marne department

References

External links

1999 Land Use, from IAURIF (Institute for Urban Planning and Development of the Paris-Île-de-France région) 
Eugene Boch, peintre Impressioniste 

Communes of Seine-et-Marne